Samyukta Karnataka is a major Kannada newspaper which has its headquarters in Hubballi, Karnataka. It is also published from Bengaluru, Mangaluru, Bagalkot, Kalaburgi and Davanagere. The incumbent editor is Hunasavadi Rajan. The newspaper is also available in an e-format on the official website.

Samyukta Karnataka was first published in 1921. It has its origins in the Indian Independence movement starting with an objective to promote ideas of nationalism.

Sister publications
Karmaveera, a weekly mag
Cc
Kasthuri, a monthly magazine

See also
 List of Kannada-language newspapers
 List of Kannada-language magazines
 List of newspapers in India
 Media in Karnataka
 Media of India

References

External links
  
https://tumakurudigitallibrary.in/publications/samyukta-karnataka

Newspapers published in Karnataka
Kannada-language newspapers
Publications established in 1921
1921 establishments in India